Puka is a small borough in Otepää Parish, Valga County, southern Estonia. It was the administrative centre of Puka Parish until 2017. At the 2011 Census, the settlement's population was 580.

Architect Georg Hellat (1870–1943) was born in Puka.

On 1 May 1897, a military train derailed 3 km north of Puka. 58 people were killed and 44 deeply wounded in the accident.

Gallery

References

External links
Puka Parish 

Boroughs and small boroughs in Estonia
Kreis Dorpat